The HD66 is a Chinese 9 mm pistol which allows an operator to fire at targets around a corner without being exposed to return fire. Its users include the Shanghai Police. It is comparable to the better known CornerShot system.

History 
At the 4th China Police Expo held in Beijing, Chinese companies introduced two kinds of nonlinear of sight tactic weapon systems, the HD66 and CF06, which are based on QSZ-92 9 mm pistol and co-developed by Chongqing Changfeng Machinery Co Ltd and Shanghai Sea Shield Technologies Company.

Details 
The HD66 weapon system including:
 QSZ92 9 mm pistol
 fire module
 double safety part
 CCD module
 video processing module
 Ocular displaying module
 illuminating module 
 weapon correction system
 radio signal transmitting/receiving module and supply power

Comparison vs Cornershot 
 HD 66 has an improved pistol mounting method than Cornershot’s 2 pressing plates to provide a higher shooting accuracy.
 HD 66 has a better man-machine interface
 Software weapon correction to replace mechanical aim point adjustment.
 The signal transmitting/receiving system can help to organize coordinated attack to provide a greater firepower.
 Ocular displaying scope conceal the shooter better than Cornershot’s LCD display

References

Pistols